Desmond Stanley Tracey Davis (24 May 1926 – 3 July 2021) was a British film and television director, best known for his 1981 version of Clash of the Titans.

Early life and career
Desmond Davis joined the British Army film unit serving at the end of the Second World War at age 18. He travelled extensively and the footage of his work can be seen in the Imperial War Museum. After serving his apprenticeship as a clapper boy in the 1940s, working on classic movies such as The African Queen, Davis worked his way up to first camera operator in low-budget British films of the 1950s. In the 1960s, Davis worked as a camera operator on such internationally acclaimed films as A Taste of Honey, The Loneliness of the Long Distance Runner, Freud: The Secret Passion (directed by John Huston) and Tom Jones, which won the Academy Award for Best Picture.

Director
Davis made his directorial debut in 1964 with Girl with Green Eyes winning the US National Board of Review award for Best Director.

His best known film is the 1981 version of Clash of the Titans.

Davis reunited with the two female stars of Girl with Green Eyes, Rita Tushingham and Lynn Redgrave, in Smashing Time (1967), a comedy set in 1960s swinging London.

At the 1966 San Sebastian International Film Festival, he won the Golden Seashell award for I Was Happy Here, which starred Sarah Miles.

In the 1970s Davis took a long hiatus from feature films, and turned his focus on television for work, including episodes of Follyfoot and The New Avengers, as well as an adaptation of William Shakespeare's Measure for Measure in the BBC Television Shakespeare series.

After directing Clash of the Titans, he directed the 1985 feature film adaptation of Agatha Christie's Ordeal by Innocence starring Donald Sutherland and Faye Dunaway. Davis also directed the 1983 television adaptation of Arthur Conan Doyle's The Sign of Four with Ian Richardson as Sherlock Holmes.

Davis continued his work in television, directing a version of Camille with Greta Scacchi and Colin Firth in 1984 and the British drama series The Chief.

Personal life and death
Davis married Shirley Smith in 1959, and the couple had one son before divorcing.

Davis died on 3 July 2021, at the age of 95.

Films Directed
Girl with Green Eyes (1964)
The Uncle (1965)
I Was Happy Here (1966)
Smashing Time (1967)
A Nice Girl Like Me (1969)
Clash of the Titans (1981)
Ordeal by Innocence (1984)

References

External links 

1926 births
2021 deaths
British television directors
Film directors from London
British Army personnel of World War II
British Army soldiers